The Elm Stakes (Japanese エルムステークス) is a Grade 3 horse race for Thoroughbreds aged three and over, run in August over a distance of 1700 metres on dirt at Sapporo Racecourse.

It was first run in 1990 and has held Grade 3 status since 1996. The first seven editions of the race took place at Hakodate Racecourse and it was also run at that track in 2013. The 2009 contest took place over 1800 metres at Niigata Racecourse

Winners since 2000

Earlier winners

 1996 - Kyoto City
 1997 - Battle Line
 1998 - Taiki Sherlock
 1999 - Nihon Pillow Jupiter

See also
 Horse racing in Japan
 List of Japanese flat horse races

References

Dirt races in Japan